Karabörk  is a belde (town) in Çanakçı district of Giresun Province, Turkey. The town is in the middle of dense forestry of the Black Sea Region. The population of Karabörk was 1031. as of 2013. In Karabörk the Ottoman  rule began by 1461 during the reign of Mehmet II (the conqueror). According to 1515 Ottoman records, it was a small settlement population of which was composed of Turks and Greeks. In the early 1700s, Turks of Çepni tribe also settled in the settlement. Ottomans mined copper in the Kırtlak mine close to Karabörk. In the early 20th century, Greek population left the settlement and during the First World War, the town suffered a brief occupation of the Russian army. In 1992 the settlement was declared a seat of township.

References

Populated places in Giresun Province
Towns in Turkey
Çanakçı District